Karen A. Matthews is an American health psychologist known for her research on the epidemiology and risk factors associated with cardiovascular disease, early signs of coronary heart disease risk in children, women's health and menopause, and  connections between socioeconomic status and health. She is Professor Emerita of Psychiatry at the University of Pittsburgh.

Education
Matthews received a bachelor's degree in psychology from the University of California, Berkeley in 1968. In 1971, she received a master's degree in psychology from California State University at San Jose. She received a PhD in psychology from the University of Texas at Austin in 1976, where she conducted her dissertation research under the supervision of David C. Glass.

Career
Matthews has served as a Distinguished Professor of Psychiatry, Epidemiology, Psychology, and Clinical and Translational Science at the University of Pittsburgh since 2009. She also works at the university as a professor of psychology and epidemiology. Matthews is the program director for the university's Cardiovascular Behavioral Medicine Research Training Program, which she started. She leads the Pittsburgh chapter of the Study of Women's Health Across the Nation (SWAN). She was elected in 2002 into the National Academy of Medicine.

From 1973 through 1978, Matthews held instructor and research associate positions at the University of Texas at Austin and Kansas State University. She has also served as: president of the Division of Health Psychology and the American Psychosomatic Society; a member of Council of the National Heart Lung and Blood Institute and the advisory board for the NIH Center for Scientific Research; and editor-in-chief of Health Psychology. She was also director of the Pittsburgh Mind-Body Center.

Awards
American Psychological Association Distinguished Scientific Award for the Applications of Psychology (2005)
American Psychosomatic Society President's Award (2005)
Philosophiae Doctor Honoris Causa, University of Helsinki, Finland (2007)
Nathan W. Perry, Jr. Award for Career Service to Health Psychology (2011)
James McKeen Cattell Lifetime Achievement Award for Applied Research, Association of Psychological Science (2013)
American Psychosomatic Society Patricia R. Barchas Award (2013)
American Psychosomatic Society Distinguished Scientist Award (2020)

References

Year of birth missing (living people)
Living people
University of Pittsburgh faculty
American psychiatrists
University of California, Berkeley alumni
21st-century American psychologists
University of Texas alumni